Ahmed Khan Andarh is a Pakistani politician who has been a Member of the Parliament Senate of Pakistan, since March 2018. He belongs to Quetta, Balochistan. He grew up in a Pashtoon family by opening eyes to Haji Zahir Khan Andarh, who is the patron of ZKB (Zahir Khan Builders). His family is part of Andarh (Khilji) community of the district Quetta. The family has immense services for the country especially in infrastructure and welfare. The family also contributes regularly in the activities of Andarh Welfare Organization, Pakistan (rgtd.) which has been working in the country for at least two decades.

Political career
Khan was elected to the Senate of Pakistan as an independent candidate on general seat from Balochistan in 2018 Pakistani Senate election. He took oath as Senator on 12 March 2018.

References

Living people
Year of birth missing (living people)
Place of birth missing (living people)
Members of the Senate of Pakistan